Lasioglossum versatum is a species of sweat bee in the family Halictidae. A common name is Experienced sweat bee.

References

Further reading

External links

 

versatum
Articles created by Qbugbot
Insects described in 1902